Bellingen may refer to:

Bellingen, Rhineland-Palatinate, a municipality in the district Westerwaldkreis, in Rhineland-Palatinate, Germany
Bellingen, Saxony-Anhalt, a municipality in the district of Stendal, in Saxony-Anhalt, Germany
Bad Bellingen, a municipality in the district of Lörrach, in Baden-Württemberg, Germany
Bellingen, New South Wales, a town in Australia
Bellingen, Belgium, a village in the municipality of Pepingen, Belgium